Billie Scott Suber (born September 26, 1934) was an American football player.  Suber was born and raised in Calhoun County, Mississippi (first in Derma and then in Calhoun City), where his father worked in a saw mill.  He attended Mississippi State University and played college football at the guard position for the Mississippi State Bulldogs football team under head coach Darrell Royal. Suber was selected by the Newspaper Enterprise Association as a first-team player on its 1955 College Football All-America Team. After leaving Mississippi State, he served in the military and later had a career with what became Renesant Bank in Tupelo, Mississippi. He was inducted into the Mississippi Sports Hall of Fame in 1993.

References

1934 births
American football guards
Mississippi State Bulldogs football players
Players of American football from Mississippi
People from Calhoun County, Mississippi
Living people
People from Calhoun City, Mississippi